Tâmna is a commune located in Mehedinți County, Oltenia, Romania. It is composed of eleven villages: Adunații Teiului, Boceni, Colareț, Cremenea, Fața Cremenii, Izvorălu, Manu, Pavăț, Plopi, Tâmna and Valea Ursului.

Education 
The commune has four elementary schools located at Izvorălu (I-VIII), Pavăț (I-IV), Plopi (I-IV) and Valea Ursului (I-VIII). After graduating from the elementary panel, the local students continue their studies by either commuting to a nearby village, Strehaia, located 10 km away or moving to Craiova or Severin, the closest cities.

Attractions 
Tâmna is well known for the wooden church, certified now as a historical monument, located a few minutes away from the local Church. Surrounded by the Foaienfir forest, the beauty of the place is enriched by the farmer's market held every Friday morning, between 8 and 11 am. Last week of October, there is the annual local festival, where the locals gather and enjoy dances, music, carnivals and local foods. In addition to it, the Șerban Farm, located 200 m towards Bâcleș from the market can be visited. It holds hundreds of bovines (breeds like Angus and Belgian Blue), goats, sheep and pigs.

Natives
Gherasim Safirin, Romanian Orthodox prelate.

References

Communes in Mehedinți County
Localities in Oltenia